Hong Li-chyn (born 23 May 1970) is a Taiwanese women's footballer who played as a goalkeeper for the Chinese Taipei women's national football team. She was part of the team at the 1991 FIFA Women's World Cup. At the club level she played for Taiwan PE College in Taiwan.

References

External links
 

1970 births
Living people
Taiwanese women's footballers
Chinese Taipei women's international footballers
Place of birth missing (living people)
1991 FIFA Women's World Cup players
Women's association football goalkeepers